Tuo River is a tributary of the  in Fenghuang County, Hunan, China.

References

 

Rivers of Hunan
Fenghuang County